Massachusetts Senate's 2nd Plymouth and Bristol district in the United States is one of 40 legislative districts of the Massachusetts Senate. As of the 2010 United States Census, it includes 28.3% of Bristol County and 1.2% of Plymouth County. Since 2003, the district consists of the city of New Bedford and the towns of Acushnet, Dartmouth, and Fairhaven in Bristol County and the town of Mattapoisett in Plymouth County. From 1987 to 2003, the district consisted of Acushnet, Dartmouth, Fairhaven, and New Bedford and was numbered as the Second Bristol district.

Democrat Mark Montigny of New Bedford has represented the district since it was created in 2003. He ran unopposed in the 2020 Massachusetts Senate election.

Locales represented
The district includes the following localities:
 New Bedford
 Acushnet
 Dartmouth
 Fairhaven
 Mattapoisett

List of senators

References 

Senate
Government of Bristol County, Massachusetts
Government of Plymouth County, Massachusetts
Massachusetts Senate